The Ajax Stakes is an Australian Turf Club Group 2  Thoroughbred quality handicap horse race, for horses aged three years old and upwards, over a distance of 1500 metres, held annually at Rosehill Racecourse in Sydney, Australia in March. Total prize money for the race is A$250,000.

History

Name
The race is named for the outstanding Hall of Fame horse and 1938 Cox Plate winner Ajax.

1974–1983 - Ajax Stakes
 1984 - Sir Robert Askin Cup
1985–1991 -  Diners' Club Cup
 1992 - Ajax Stakes
 1993 - Sydney Turf Club 50th Anniversary Stakes
1994–1995 -  Ajax Stakes 
 1996 - Konica Stakes
 1997 - Ajax Stakes
 1998 - Parramatta Leagues Club Stakes
 1999 - Ajax Stakes
2000–2002 -  Parramatta Leagues Club Stakes
2003 onwards  -  Ajax Stakes

Distance
1974–1978 – 1200 metres
1979–1983 – 1400 metres
1984 onwards - 1500 metres

Grade
 1974–1979 - Principal race
 1980–1983 - Listed race
 1984–2005 - Group 3
 2006 onwards - Group 2 race

Winners

 2023 - Cepheus  
 2022 - Just Folk  
 2021 - I Am Superman 
 2020 - Imaging 
 2019 - Fifty Stars 
 2018 - Comin' Through 
 2017 - It's Somewhat 
 2016 - It's Somewhat 
 2015 - Burbero
 2014 - Messene
 2013 - Havana Rey
 2012 - Niagara
 2011 - Pureness
 2010 - Brilliant Light
 2009 - Solo Flyer
 2008 - All Silent
 2007 - High Cee
 2006 - Malcolm
 2005 - River To The Sea
 2004 - True Glo
 2003 - Grand Armee
 2002 - Mowerman
 2001 - Galiano
 2000 - Normal Practice
 1999 - Confiscate
 1998 - Confiscate
 1997 - Catalan Opening
 1996 - Catalan Opening
 1995 - Protara's Bay
 1994 - Poetic King
 1993 - Soho Square
 1992 - Alderson
 1991 - From The Planet
 1990 - Windsor's Pal
 1989 - Jondolar
 1988 - Imprimatur
 1987 - Mac's Treasure
 1986 - Sea Pictures
 1985 - Royal Troubador
 1984 - Vite Cheval     
 1983 - C'Est Si Bon
 1982 - Winter's Dance
 1981 - Thumb Print
 1980 - Lowan Star
 1979 - Lloyd Boy
 1978 - Count Rajan 
 1977 - Tiger Town
 1976 - Wayne's Bid
 1975 - Helmsman
 1974 - Tontonan

See also
 List of Australian Group races
 Group races

External links 
First three placegetters Ajax Stakes (ATC)

References

Horse races in Australia